This list includes African countries and regions 
that were part of the Roman Empire, 
or that were given Latin place names in historical references.

Background

Until the Modern Era, Latin was the common language for scholarship and mapmaking. During the 19th and 20th centuries, German scholars in particular have made significant contributions to the study of historical place names, or Ortsnamenkunde. These studies have, in turn, contributed to the study of genealogy. For genealogists and historians of pre-Modern Europe, knowing alternate names of places is vital to extracting information from both public and private records. Even specialists in this field point out, however, that the information can be easily taken out of context, since there is a great deal of repetition of place names throughout Europe; reliance purely on apparent connections should therefore be tempered with valid historical methodology.

Caveats and notes
Latin place names are not always exclusive to one place — for example, there were several Roman cities whose names began with Colonia and then a more descriptive term. During the Middle Ages, these were often shortened to just Colonia. One of these, Colonia Agrippinensis, retains the name today in the form of Cologne.

Early sources for Roman names show numerous variants and spellings of the Latin names.

The modern canonical name is listed first. 
Sources are listed chronologically. 
In general, only the earliest source is shown for each name, 
although many of the names are recorded in more than one of the sources. 
Where the source differs in spelling, 
or has other alternatives, 
these are listed following the source. 
As an aid to searching, 
variants are spelled completely, 
and listed in most likely chronology.

Superscripts indicate:
 Latinized form of the Greek-derived name.
 Latinized form of the Asian-derived name via Greek.
 Altered Latinized form of the Greek-derived name.

Cities and towns in Algeria

Cities and towns in Libya

Cities and towns in Morocco

Cities and towns in Tunisia

See also 
 Chemical elements named after places (several element names employ Latin place names)
 List of Latin place names used as specific names

References
In order of likely publication:

PNH: Pliny (Gaius Plinius Secundus), Naturalis Historia; book "PNH" chapter (that is, "37PNH81" instead of the usual "N.H.xxxvii.81").
PG: Ptolemy (Claudius Ptolemaeus), Geographia; book "PG" chapter (that is, "2PG3" instead of the usual "II.3"). Ptolemy wrote in Greek, so names are transliterated back into Latin to reveal the original form.
HLU: Hofmann, Johann Jacob (1635-1706): Lexicon Universale
GOL: The standard reference to Latin placenames, with their modern equivalents, is Dr. J. G. Th. Grässe, Orbis Latinus: Lexikon lateinischer geographischer Namen des Mittelalters und der Neuzeit (1861), an exhaustive work of meticulous German scholarship that is available online in the second edition of 1909. To use it, one must understand German names of countries, as they were in 1909. The original was re-edited and expanded in a multivolume edition in 1972.

External links 
Grässe, Orbis Latinus
Grässe, Orbis Latinus
Hofmann: Lexicon Universale
Pliny the Elder: the Natural History
Ptolemy: the Geography
Unesco: Leptis Magna
Unesco: Volubilis
Unesco: Cuicul

Names of places in Africa
Africa
Latin, Africa
Latin place names